Patrick O'Leary may refer to:
Patrick O'Leary (canoeist), who became the first Irish Paralympic athlete to qualify for the final of the KL3 canoeing at the 2016 Summer Paralympics
Pat O'Leary, rugby league footballer of the 1940s and 1950s
Patrick O'Leary (writer) (born 1952), science fiction author
Patrick Albert O'Leary, the wartime alias of Belgian Resistance member Albert Guérisse
Patrick O'Leary, husband to Catherine O'Leary of the Great Chicago Fire
Patrick I. O'Leary (1888–1944), Australian poet and journalist